Damo can refer to:

Damo (Korea), a class of servants in Korea
Damo (TV series), a 2003 Korean TV drama miniseries
Damo, Somalia, an historic town in northeastern Somalia
DAMO Academy, research division of Alibaba Group

People
Demo (ancient Greek poet) (fl. c. AD 200), ancient Greek poetess. Her name is also spelt Damo.
Damo (philosopher) (fl. c. 500 BC), daughter of Pythagoras and Theano
Bodhidharma (5th or 6th century), Indian founder of Zen Buddhism, known as Damo (達摩) in China
Damo Suzuki (born 1950), Japanese musician
Big Damo (born 1985), a ring name of Northern Irish professional wrestler Killian Dain

See also
 Damo and Ivor, an Irish comedy duo act